Barkeh-ye Chupan (also Romanized as Barkeh-ye Chūpān and Barkeh Chūpān; also known as Bargeh Choopan) is a village in Howmeh Rural District of the Central District of Kangan County, Bushehr province, Iran. At the 2006 census, its population was 238 in 56 households. The following census in 2011 counted 689 people in 150 households. The latest census in 2016 showed a population of 1,235 people in 223 households; it was the largest village in its rural district.

References 

Populated places in Kangan County